The Buyan class, Russian designations Project 21630 Buyan and Project 21631 Buyan-M, are series of corvettes (small artillery and missile ships in Russian classification) developed by Zelenodolsk Design Bureau for the Russian Navy. Since 2010, all subsequent vessels are being constructed as improved Project 21631 subclass, incorporating greater tonnage, stealth technology and the 3S14 vertical launching system for either Kalibr or Oniks anti-ship cruise missiles, significantly enhancing combat capabilities. The ships are primarily designed for operations within littoral zones to protect Russia's vast coastal areas. Due to the small tonnage, they can operate even within shallow parts of oceans and seas and Russia's extensive inland waterway system. The export variant is known as Project 21632 Tornado.

Design
In August 2010, some information about the newly modified Project 21631, dubbed as Buyan-M, were published. The Project 21631 ships are said to be an up-to-date variant of Project 21630 Buyan small artillery ship, armed with the nuclear-capable Kalibr cruise missiles (SS-N-27 Sizzler) with a claimed range of at least 1,500 km and electronic countermeasure equipment. Ships of Project 21631 are designed to defend the national economic zones of Russia. The ships' small size and displacement enable them to operate within inland river systems, including traversing the Moscow Canal which allows them to deploy to various seas around European Russia. This is a particular advantage for the Buyan-M series, because while the Intermediate-Range Nuclear Forces Treaty (INF) prohibits long-range cruise missiles from operating on land they can operate from ships, so a river-based corvette can deploy missiles without being subject to restrictions. The lead ship of this project, Grad Sviyazhsk, was laid down on 27 August 2010 and commissioned on 27 July 2014.

Operational history
On 7 October 2015, corvettes Grad Sviyazhsk, Uglich, Velikiy Ustyug and  Dagestan, deployed in the Caspian Sea, launched 26 Kalibr cruise missiles at 11 terrorist targets in Syria. According to US DoD officials, several of these cruise missiles fired from Russian ships crashed in Iran and did not make it to their intended targets in Syria. An Iranian dissident organizations's TV reported that an "unidentified flying object" crashed and exploded in a village near the Iranian city of Takab.

On 20 November 2015, the same warships launched 18 Kalibr cruise missiles from the Caspian Sea at seven terrorist targets in Rakka, Idlib and Aleppo provinces.

On 13 February 2016, corvette Zelenyy Dol was deployed to the Mediterranean Sea.

On 19 August 2016, corvettes Zelenyy Dol and Serpukhov, deployed in the Mediterranean Sea, launched Kalibr cruise missiles at positions of Al-Nusra terrorist group in Syria. As a result of the strikes, number of terrorist facilities were destroyed, including command post and base near the village of Dar Ta Izzah and weapon production plants and warehouses in Aleppo province.

On 25 October 2016, Zelenyy Dol and Serpukhov were deployed to the Baltic Sea to join a newly formed division in Kaliningrad. In 2020, Zelenyy Dol and the Karakurt-class corvette Odintsovo deployed to Arctic waters utilizing Russian internal waterways and illustrating the Russian capacity to transfer light units among the Russian Navy's three western fleets and the Caspian Flotilla as might be required.

Variants
 Project 21630 Buyan
 Project 21631 Buyan-M – Upgraded design with modernised systems and new weapons
 Project 21632 Tornado – Export design
 Project 21635 Sarsar – Unveiled at Army-2022 expo, with an increased number of VLS cells, as well as a larger displacement overall

Ships

See also
 List of ships of the Soviet Navy
 List of ships of Russia by project number
 Karakurt-class corvette
 Rubin-class patrol boat

References

External links
Project 21630 - Complete Ship List
Project 21631 - Complete Ship List

Corvette classes
Corvettes of Russia
Stealth ships